Eilert Lund Sundt (8 August 1817 – 13 June 1875) was a Norwegian theologist and sociologist, known for his work on mortality, marriage and other subjects among the working class. He was an early pioneer of the field of sociology in Norway.

Early and personal life
He was born in Farsund as a son of Lars Mortensen Sundt (1762–1850) and Karen Bing Drejer (1777–1865). He was a distant descendant of Peter Drejer. He was a third cousin of Christian Sundt, uncle of Lauritz and Karen Sundt, granduncle of Vigleik, Halfdan and Harald Sundt, and great-granduncle of Leif Sundt Rode.

His father was a ship captain, and he was born into a large family of 13 children. All the children worked to help make ends meet. Farsund at that time had many seamen, small fishermen and chandlers. This provided his initial exposure to the ideas which he came to examine extensively later in his life: poverty, overpopulation and the work issues associated with the transition from an older farm culture to 19th century business and industry.

In February 1859 he married Nicoline Conradine Hansen (1822–81), a daughter of Maurits Christopher Hansen. They had the son Einar Sundt, a publisher.

Career
In 1835 he began his studies in Kristiania, but came back to Farsund in 1838 and became a teacher. He resumed his studies in Kristiania in 1841. There he met and became close friends with Henrik Wergeland, who was also born and raised in Agder. When Henrik Wergeland was buried in 1845, Eilert Sundt led the student contingent and spoke at the funeral on their behalf.

His interests in sociology were broad. He studied prison conditions, customs and treatment of Gypsies, causes of death, the evils of married life in Norway, conditions of prostitutes, suicide, fishery and forestry workers' living and working conditions, building customs, shipping practices, household cleanliness and administration of poverty laws. A man of his times, he also was interested in ethnography, ethnology, vernacular architecture, demography, and linguistics (with special emphasis on the dialects of Norwegian).

From 1857 to 1866 Eilert Sundt was editor for Folkevennen ("Friend of the People"), for which he wrote a number of the more important articles. His work served to inform many of the authors of Norwegian literature in their transition to a socially aware realism at the close of the 19th century.

Eilert Sundt served as the parish priest in Eidsvoll from 1869, and he died there in 1875.

Two of his works were selected for the Norwegian Sociology Canon in 2009–2011.

References

External links 
Family genealogy
 Eilert Sundt (in Norwegian)
 Eilert Sundt's work
 Eilert Sundt as suicide researcher

1817 births
1875 deaths
People from Farsund
Norwegian sociologists
19th-century Norwegian Lutheran clergy
19th-century Norwegian writers